Muhammad Nurfais bin Johari (born 27 March 1999) is a Malaysian footballer who plays for PDRM as a midfielder in the Malaysia Premier League.

Career

He made his professional debut for Penang in a 1–0 Premier League defeat to PDRM on 24 February 2018. In that match, he came on as a late substitute.

International career

Youth
Nurfais was part of the national team  for the 2017 AFF U-18 Youth Championship that will take place in Yangon, Myanmar. 

He was named in the Malaysia under 19 squad for 2018 AFF U-19 Youth Championship in the Indonesia. He has played in the final against Myanmar which Malaysia win 4–3.

On 15 October 2018, he was named in the under-19 side for the 2018 AFC U-19 Championship.

Career statistics

Club

Honours

International
Malaysia U-19
 AFF U-19 Youth Championship: 2018
 AFF U-19 Youth Championship runners up : 2017

Club
Penang FA
 Malaysia Premier League :2020

References

External links
 

Living people
1999 births
Malaysian footballers
Penang F.C. players
People from Penang
Malaysia Premier League players
Association football midfielders
Malaysian people of Malay descent